Endeitoma is a genus of cylindrical bark beetles in the family Zopheridae. There are at least 2 described species in Endeitoma.

Species
 Endeitoma dentata (Horn, 1885)
 Endeitoma granulata (Say, 1826)

References

Further reading

 
 
 

Zopheridae